This is a list of Brazilian scientists, those born in Brazil or who have established citizenship or residency there.

 Manuel de Abreu (1894–1962), physician, inventor of abreugraphy (mass radiography of the lungs for screening tuberculosis)
 Aziz Ab'Saber (1924–2012), geographer; geologist; ecologist recognized for the Theory of Refuges and Amazon studies; former president of the SBPC
 Fernando Flávio Marques de Almeida (1916–2013), geologist
 Carlos Paz de Araújo, scientist and inventor, holds nearly 600 patents in the area of nanotechnology
 José Márcio Ayres (1954–2003), biologist, zoologist, primatologist
 Marcia Barbosa (born 1960), physicist
 Eddy Bensoussan (born 1938), physician
 Wilson Teixeira Beraldo (1917–1998), co-discoverer of bradykinin
 Thaisa Storchi Bergmann (born 1955), astrophysicist at the Universidade Federal do Rio Grande do Sul
 Carlos Augusto Bertulani (born 1955), physicist
 Vital Brazil (1865–1950), physician and scientist, discoverer of the antivenom for snakes and other venomous animals
 Ennio Candotti (born 1942), physicist and scientific leader
 Fernando Henrique Cardoso (born 1931), sociologist and former President
 José Cândido de Melo Carvalho (1914–1994), biologist, zoologist, entomologist
 Carlos Chagas (1879–1934), biologist, zoologist, public health worker
 Evandro Chagas (1905–1940), physician and biomedical scientist specialized in tropical medicine; son of Carlos Chagas
 Gauss Moutinho Cordeiro (born 1952), mathematician and statistician
 Vera Cordeiro (born 1950), social entrepreneur and physician
 Newton da Costa (born 1929), mathematician and logician, recognised for his works in paraconsistent logic
 Oswaldo Cruz (1872–1917), physician and public health champion, eliminated yellow fever, bubonic plague and smallpox in Rio de Janeiro at the turn of the 20th century
 Johanna Döbereiner (1924–2000), biologist, discoverer of the nitrogen fixing role of soil bacteria
 Adolpho Ducke (1876–1959), Croatian-Brazilian biologist; zoologist; entomologist; botanist
 Florestan Fernandes (1920–1995), father of Brazilian sociology
 Sérgio Henrique Ferreira (1934–2016), physician and pharmacologist, discovered the active principle of a drug for hypertension
 Carlos Chagas Filho (1910–2000), physician and physiologist, former president of the Brazilian Academy of Sciences, former president of the Pontifical Academy of Sciences; son of Carlos Chagas
 Hércules Florence (1804–1879), pioneer of photography
 Santiago Americano Freire (1908–1997), physician and professor of pharmacology, psychiatrist, writer, painter
 Gilberto Freyre (1900–1987), historiographer and sociologist
 Celso Furtado (1920–2004), noted economist and ideologue of economy of developing nations
 Marcelo Gleiser (born 1959), physicist, writer and professor of physics and astronomy at the Dartmouth College since 1991
 José Goldemberg (born 1928), physicist, former Minister of Science & Technology and Dean of the University of São Paulo
 Émil Göldi (1859–1917), Swiss-Brazilian biologist; zoologist; naturalist
 Bartolomeu de Gusmão (1685–1724), Brazilian Catholic priest, pioneer of aviation, the inventor of the balloon, became known as the "flying priest"
 Jacques Hüber (1867–1914), Swiss-Brazilian biologist; botanist
 Ivan Izquierdo (1937–2021), physician and neuroscientist; discovered neural mechanisms of memory
 Jean Paul Jacob (1937–2019), electronic engineer, researcher and professor, research manager at the Almaden IBM Research Center, California
 Adib Jatene (1929–2014), heart surgeon
 Alexander Kellner (born 1961), Liechtensteinian/Brazilian paleontologist
 Warwick Estevam Kerr (1922–2018), geneticist, researcher on the biology and genetics of bees
 Eduardo Krieger (born 1928), physician and physiologist, former president of the Brazilian Academy of Sciences
 César Lattes (1924–2005), experimental physicist, co-discoverer of the pion, a type of subatomic particle, first president of the Brazilian National Research Council
 Napoleão Laureano (1914–1951), cancer researcher
 Aristides Leão (1914–1993), physician and physiologist, discovered Leão's depression, a phenomenon of nervous tissue
 Ângelo Moreira da Costa Lima (1887–1964), doctor, entomologist
 Henrique da Rocha Lima (1879–1956), physician, pathologist and infectologist, discovered Rickettsia prowazekii, the pathogen of epidemic typhus
 José Leite Lopes (1918–2006), theoretical physicist
 Adolfo Lutz (1855–1940), physician and pioneer of public health
 José Lutzenberger (1926–2002), ecologist and zoologist
 Roberto Landell de Moura (1861–1928), pioneer of telephony
 Fritz Müller (1821–1897), German-Brazilian biologist; zoologist; botanist; naturalist; entomologist
 Miguel Nicolelis (born 1961), neuroscientist, one of Scientific American's best scientists of 2004
 Jacob Palis (born 1940), mathematician of international fame, current president of the Brazilian Academy of Sciences
 Maurício Peixoto (1921–2019), engineer, mathematician, pioneered the studies on structural stability, author of Peixoto's theorem
 Domingos Soares Ferreira Penna (1818–1888), biologist, zoologist, naturalist
 José Aristodemo Pinotti (1934–2009), physician and gynecologist, former president of the International Federation of Gynecology and Obstetrics
 Marcos Pontes (born 1963), first Brazilian astronaut, Missão Centenário
 Patricia Pranke (born 1967), stem cell researcher, professor
 Ana Maria Primavesi (1920–2020), soil scientist and promoter of the ecological management of tropical soils
 André Rebouças (1838–1898), pioneer engineer, brother of Antônio Rebouças Filho
 José Reis (1907–2002), biologist, greatest Brazilian science writer
 Gilberto Righi (1937–1999), biologist, zoologist, specialist on earthworms
 Milton Santos (1926–2001), geographer, won the Vautrin Lud International Geography Prize, the highest award that can be gained in the field of geography
 Alberto Santos-Dumont (1873–1932), aviator and inventor
 Mário Schenberg (1914–1990), theoretical physicist
 Helmut Sick (1910–1991), German-Brazilian biologist; zoologist; ornithologist
 Lotar Siewerdt (born 1939), agronomist; forage production
 Manuel Augusto Pirajá da Silva (1873–1961), responsible for the identification and complete description of the pathogenic agent and the pathophysiological cycle of schistosomiasis disease
 Maurício Rocha e Silva (1910–1983), physician and pharmacologist, discovered bradykinin, an active cardiovascular peptide
 Emilio Joaquim da Silva Maia (1808–1859), physician and naturalist
 Nise da Silveira (1905–1999), psychiatrist and mental health reformer
 Jorge Stolfi (born 1950), computer scientist, professor at UNICAMP
 Jayme Tiomno (1920–2011), experimental and theoretical nuclear physicist
 Paulo Emílio Vanzolini (1924–2013), biologist, zoologist, herpetologist
 Glaci Zancan (1935–2007), biochemist
 Mayana Zatz (born 1947), biologist and geneticist
 Euryclides Zerbini (1912–1993), heart surgeon, pioneer of first heart transplant in Brazil

Foreign scientists and engineers who lived or live in Brazil
 Alexander Grothendieck (1928–2014), French mathematician
 David Bohm (1917–1992), American physicist
 Gregory Chaitin (born 1947), Argentine-American mathematician
 Louis Couty (1854–1884), French physiologist and pharmacologist
 Miguel Rolando Covian (1913–1992), Argentinian physiologist
 Orville Adalbert Derby (1851–1915), American geologist
 Heinz Ebert (1907–1983), German geologist
 Luigi Fantappiè (1901–1956), Italian mathematician
 Richard Feynman (1918–1988), American physicist
 Charles Frederick Hartt (1840–1878), Canadian-American geologist and paleontologist
 Hermann von Ihering (1850–1930), German naturalist
 Fritz Köberle (1910–1983), Austrian physician and pathologist
 Grigori Ivanovitch Langsdorff (1774–1852), German/Russian naturalist
 Claude Lévi-Strauss (1908–2009), French anthropologist
 Emmanuel Liais (1826–1900), French astronomer and naturalist
 Lucien Lison (1908–1984), Belgian anatomist
 Fritz Müller (1821–1897), German naturalist
 Giuseppe Occhialini (1907–1993), Italian physicist
 Ludwig Riedel (1790–1861), German botanist
 Oscar Sala (1922–2010), Italian nuclear physicist
 Carl August Wilhelm Schwacke (1848–1904), German botanist
 Friedrich Sellow (1789–1831), German botanist
 Helmut Sick (1910–1991), German zoologist
 Peter Szatmari (born 1950), Hungarian geologist
 Gleb Wataghin (1899–1986), Russian/Italian physicist
 Stefan Zweig (1881–1942), Austrian novelist, playwright, journalist and biographer

See also 
 Brazilian expatriate academics
 List of Brazilian mathematicians
 National Order of Scientific Merit
 List of Brazilian intellectuals and thinkers

References

Further reading
 Notable Brazilian Scientists (in Portuguese)

Scientist
 List of Brazilian Scientists
Brazilian